Allendale is a census-designated place (CDP) in Ottawa County in the U.S. state of Michigan.  The population was 17,579 at the 2010 census.  It is located within Allendale Charter Township, occupying approximately the northern two-thirds of the township, from the eastern boundary with the Grand River west along Pierce St., north along 75th Ave., then west along Lake Michigan Drive (M-45) to the western boundary of the township. It is a part of the Grand Rapids-Muskegon-Holland, Michigan combined statistical area, and is an exurb of Grand Rapids, due to its major commuter routes into the city (M-45 and I-96).

The ZIP code 49401 serves all of Allendale and many of the remnant portions of the township, as well as portions of Blendon Township to the south and Georgetown Township to the southeast.

Allendale is named for the township. The township was organized in 1849, state senator Pennoyer changed the name to Allendale, after Agnes Allen, the first person on the tax roll in the area and the widow of Hannibal Allen, who was the son of Revolutionary War hero Ethan Allen.

Allendale is home to the main campus of Grand Valley State University.

Geography

Geographic features
Grand River (Michigan)

Demographics

As of the census of 2000, there were 11,555 people, 2,864 households, and 1,913 families residing in the CDP. The racial makeup of the CDP was 93.22% White, 2.97% African American, 0.34% Native American, 0.89% Asian, 0.08% Pacific Islander, 1.45% from other races, and 1.06% from two or more races. Hispanic or Latino of any race were 3.03% of the population.

There were 2,864 households, out of which 38.5% had children under the age of 18 living with them, 57.8% were married couples living together, 6.3% had a female householder with no husband present, and 33.2% were non-families. 16.1% of all households were made up of individuals, and 3.5% had someone living alone who was 65 years of age or older.  The average household size was 2.98 and the average family size was 3.36.

In the CDP the population was spread out, with 20.7% under the age of 18, 43.1% from 18 to 24, 22.1% from 25 to 44, 9.6% from 45 to 64, and 4.6% who were 65 years of age or older.  The median age was 21 years. For every 100 females, there were 87.3 males.  For every 100 females age 18 and over, there were 83.6 males.

The median income for a household in the CDP was $46,671, and the median income for a family was $58,371. Males had a median income of $39,038 versus $25,146 for females. The per capita income for the community was $14,580.  About 2.4% of families and 12.5% of the population were below the poverty line, including 2.5% of those under age 18 and 3.6% of those age 65 or over.

Education

Primary and secondary schools

 Allendale Public Schools
 Allendale High School
New Options Alternative High School
Allendale Middle School
Oakwood Intermediate School
Springview Elementary
Evergreen Elementary
 Allendale Christian School

Higher education
Grand Valley State University is the fastest growing university in the United States, both in population and physical size, as the university is continually building more facilities. The university is also ranked as one of the top up and coming schools in the Midwest. The university enrolls a total of just under 25,000 students on the Allendale campus and two campuses in the surrounding area, and offers over 200 areas of study, making it the largest university in the Grand Rapids region.

Parks

Allendale Community Park is a 40-acre park situated near the township office. It contains a Veterans Garden of Honor honoring U.S. soldiers. It contains nine statues representing veterans of U.S. wars. One of the statues, installed in 1998, depicting a Confederate and Union soldier standing back-to-back with a young slave crouched between them at their feet, has been controversial for seeming to honor the Confederacy.
During the George Floyd protests in 2020, the Allendale Township Board voted on June 30, 2020 to keep it.

Points of interest

On Campus
Lubbers Stadium, home of Grand Valley State Laker football.
Cook Carillon Tower
The Meadows at Grand Valley State University
GVSU Fieldhouse

Off Campus

Grand River
Bass River State Recreation Area
 Placid Wake Park
 Grand River Park

Local media

Newspapers
Grand Valley Lanthorn

Radio
WGVU-FM (88.5 FM Allendale/Grand Rapids) – GVSU Public Radio (NPR/Jazz)
WCKS "The Whale" – GVSU student run radio

Television
WGVU-TV – GVSU PBS member station
GVBN – GVSU student run television station

Transportation

Mass transit
Interurban Transit Partnership (The Rapid), is a public regional bus system that provides transit throughout the eastern part of Allendale, GVSU, Grand Rapids and the surrounding areas. It connects Allendale and GVSU with Grand Rapids and GVSU's Pew Campus.

Major highways

References

External links

Allendale Charter Township

 
Grand Valley State University
Populated places established in 1842
1842 establishments in Michigan
Census-designated places in Ottawa County, Michigan
Census-designated places in Michigan
Unincorporated communities in Michigan
Unincorporated communities in Ottawa County, Michigan